Saudi Binladin Group (SBG), known as Binladin Group Global Holding Company since 2019, is a multinational construction conglomerate headquartered in Jeddah, Saudi Arabia. In 2011, the Saudi Binladin Group signed a US$1.23 billion contractual agreement to construct the tallest building in the world, Jeddah Tower in Jeddah. They are also party to a US$3.4 billion agreement to construct the Doha Metro located in Doha. The conglomerate comprises an estimated 537 companies. The group's founder was Mohammed bin Awad bin Laden, the father of Osama bin Laden.

Overview
The SBG was founded in 1931 by Sheikh Mohammed bin Awad bin Laden Sayyid, whose relationship with the country's founder, Abdulaziz Al Saud, led to important government contracts such as refurbishing the mosques at Mecca and Medina. In 1964, Mohammed bin Laden was commissioned to reclad the Dome of the Rock in Jerusalem. After the death of Sheikh Mohammed in 1967, the group was headed by Mohammed Bahareth, brother of Mohammed's first wife and uncle of his oldest children. In 1972, Salem bin Laden, the eldest son of Mohammed bin Laden, took over as his father's successor with the assistance of several brothers. Upon Salem's death in a plane crash in 1988, the leadership of the group passed to one of Salem's brothers, Bakr, the current chairman, along with thirteen other brothers who make up the board of the bin Laden group. The most important of these include Hassan bin Laden, Yeslam bin Ladin and Yehia bin Laden. The most controversial brother was Osama bin Laden, the leader of terror-organisation Al-Qaeda and perpetrator of the September 11 attacks.

The Group considered an initial public offering in 2011, but declined to do so due to a combination of low oil prices, a weak stock market, and bureaucratic obstacles.

In April 2018, Bakr bin Laden, as well as his brothers Saleh and Saad, transferred their 36.2% stake in the Saudi Binladin Group to the Istidama Holding Company, which is owned by the Ministry of Finance. The government of Saudi Arabia subsequently established a five-person committee to run the Binladen Group, which includes of Abdul Rahman Al Harkan, Khaled Nahas, Khalid Al Khowaiter. Reuters described the ownership transfer as a functional nationalization, with al-Harkan, the committee's chairman, reporting to Finance Minister Mohammed Al-Jadaan. al-Karkan subsequently negotiated an 11 billion riyal loan from the Ministry of Finance.

Current activities
The bin Laden group is represented in most Saudi cities — Riyadh, Dammam — and in a number of capital cities in the region (Beirut, Cairo, Amman, Dubai). According to a synopsis by the PBS news program Frontline:
in Egypt the SBG is headed by Omar bin Laden as Chairman, Khaled bin Laden as vice chairman, Tarek Helmy as CEO, and represents that country's largest foreign-owned private equity group, with over 40,000 employees.
in Lebanon the SBG, represented by Yehia bin Laden, has been holding negotiations with the local authorities for a $50 million share in the project to rebuild the Beirut Central District within the framework of the Solidere Project and in conjunction with the al Baraka Group and the bin Mahfouz Group.
in London the SBG set up a representative firm called Binexport in November 1990.

The Group has constructed Abraj Al Bait Towers in Mecca and has been contracted by Kingdom Holding Company to build the Jeddah Tower.

On 11 September 2015, while doing construction work in the Grand Mosque in Mecca, Saudi Arabia, one of the Group's cranes collapsed due to high winds causing 118 deaths and almost 400 injuries. As a result, the Saudi king banned the firm from taking new projects while having its current projects reviewed. The Saudi government removed the ban on the Binladin Group in May 2016, allowing them to bid on new projects.

Saudi Arabia projects
Royal Terminal, Jeddah
King Abdulaziz International Airport, New Haj Terminal, Jeddah
Al Faisaliyah Center
Madina-Qassim Expressway
Um Alqura University, Makkah
Lotus Compounds, Jeddah
Noura bint Abdul Rahman University 
Abraj Al Bait Towers, Makkah
Jeddah Tower, Jeddah
King Abdullah Economic City
Jamaraat Bridge
Saudi Arabia National Guard Housing Project
Saudi Arabian Railways Projects CTW-100 and CTW 110
 Al Masjid Al-Haram expansion.

International projects
Blaise Diagne International Airport, Senegal

Sharjah International Airport Expansion & Development, UAE
University of Sharjah, UAE
Expansion of Velana International Airport, Maldives
Kuala Lumpur International Airport, Malaysia

Website
SBG's Internet domain name, saudi-binladin-group.com, was registered on September 11, 2000, for one year, expiring on the same day as the September 11 attacks. The domain was later acquired by a domain speculator.

References

External links
Saudi Binladin Group website
Saudi Binladin Group website in United Arab Emirates (.ae) – full version
Bin Laden Group at Sourcewatch

1931 establishments in Saudi Arabia
Construction and civil engineering companies established in 1931
Construction and civil engineering companies of Saudi Arabia
Companies based in Jeddah
Bin Laden family